Jalan PP Narayanan or Jalan 222 is a major road in Petaling Jaya city, Selangor, Malaysia. On Google Maps, it is listed as Persiaran P.P. Narayanan. The road was named after the Malaysian Trade Union Congress's (MTUC) first president, P.P. Narayanan.

List of junctions

References

Roads in Petaling Jaya